Ukpik Peak is a mountain associated with the Baffin Mountains on Baffin Island, Nunavut, Canada.

Geography
Ukpik Peak is located at the southern end of the Remote Peninsula between the Stewart Valley and Sam Ford Fiord.

At  it is the twenty-eighth-highest peak in Nunavut and the eighth-highest peak in the territory by topographic prominence. However, it is not as conspicuous as Sail Peaks rising  to the northwest facing Stewart Valley.

References

External links
 "Ukpik Peak, Nunavut" on Peakbagger

Arctic Cordillera
Mountains of Baffin Island
One-thousanders of Nunavut